Hu Yueyue (born 13 March 1990) is a Chinese former tennis player.

Hu has a career-high WTA singles ranking of 249, achieved on 6 August 2012, and a career-high WTA doubles ranking of 429, reached on 31 December 2012. She won one doubles title on the ITF Women's Circuit.

Hu made her WTA Tour main-draw debut at the 2011 China Open, where she played South African Chanelle Scheepers, and lost 0–6, 7–5, 0–6.

At the 2012 Guangzhou International Women's Open, Hu qualified for the main draw, defeating Liu Chang, Erika Sema and Zhao Yijing en route. In the main draw, she drew the third seed Sorana Cîrstea, and lost 2–6, 5–7.

ITF Circuit finals

Singles: 1 (runner-up)

Doubles: 2 (1 title, 1 runner-up)

References

External links
 
 

1990 births
Living people
Chinese female tennis players
21st-century Chinese women